This page indexes the individual years pages. Each year is ordered.

1st millennium BC

1st century BC

2nd century BC

3rd century BC

4th century BC

5th century BC

6th century BC

7th century BC

1st millennium

1st century

2nd century

3rd century

4th century

5th century

6th century

7th century

8th century

9th century

10th century

2nd millennium

11th century

12th century

13th century

14th century

15th century

16th century

17th century

18th century

19th century

20th century

3rd millennium

21st century

See also
List of decades, centuries, and millennia
Lists of years by topic
Timeline of the far future

Historical timelines